La Pau is a Barcelona metro station located in the neighbourhood of the same name, in the Sant Martí district.

The station is located underground of Carrer Guipúscoa and Carrer Ca n'Oliva. In  it became the northern terminus of L2, which had formerly been in Sagrada Família.

After several modifications on both lines, it has finally become the north-eastern terminus of L4, which is currently undergoing a substantial extension towards the future Sagrera railway station.

Services

References

External links
 
 La Pau at Trenscat.com

Railway stations in Spain opened in 1982
Transport in Sant Martí (district)
Barcelona Metro line 2 stations
Barcelona Metro line 4 stations